Jan Hora (born 1900, date of death unknown) was a Czech water polo player. He competed at the 1920 Summer Olympics and the 1924 Summer Olympics.

He has been a police commissioner since graduating from college. In the 1930s, he was mentioned in the press on the occasion of investigations into various cases. In 1938, he was promoted to the position of police councillor. After the Second World War he held the post of chief councillor in the Home Office. In 1948, he was the chief investigator into the mysterious death of Jan Masaryk.

References

External links
 

1900 births
Year of death missing
Czechoslovak male water polo players
Olympic water polo players of Czechoslovakia
Water polo players at the 1920 Summer Olympics
Water polo players at the 1924 Summer Olympics
Place of birth missing